2019–20 Albanian Cup is the sixty-eighth season of Albania's annual cup competition. Kukësi are the defending champions. Teuta won the cup for the fourth time in their history.

Format
Ties are played in a two-legged format similar to those of European competitions. If the aggregate score is tied after both games, the team with the higher number of away goals advances. If the number of away goals is equal in both games, the match is decided by extra time and a penalty shoot-out, if necessary.

Preliminary round
In order to reduce the number of participating teams for the first round to 32, a preliminary tournament is played. In contrast to the main tournament, the preliminary tournament is held as a single-leg knock-out competition. Matches were played on 4 September 2019.

|-

|}

First round
All 30 teams of the 2019–20 Kategoria Superiore and Kategoria e Parë entered in this round along with the two qualifiers from the preliminary round. The first legs were played on 18 September 2019 and the second legs took place on 1 and 2 October 2019.

|}

Partizani advanced to the second round.

Teuta advanced to the second round.

Flamurtari advanced to the second round.

Tirana advanced to the second round.

Kastrioti advanced to the second round.

Vllaznia advanced to the second round.

Erzeni advanced to the second round.

Besëlidhja advanced to the second round.

Kukësi advanced to the second round.

Skënderbeu advanced to the second round.

Laçi advanced to the second round.

Luftëtari advanced to the second round.

Apolonia advanced to the second round.

Bylis advanced to the second round.

Besa advanced to the second round.

Lushnja advanced to the second round.

Second round
All  the 16 qualified teams from the first round progressed to the second round. The first legs were played on 29 and 30 January 2020 and the second legs took place on 12 February 2020.

|}

Besëlidhja advanced to the quarter finals.

Teuta advanced to the quarter finals.

Vllaznia advanced to the quarter finals.

Tirana advanced to the quarter finals.

Kukësi advanced to the quarter finals.

Skënderbeu advanced to the quarter finals.

Bylis advanced to the quarter finals.

Apolonia advanced to the quarter finals.

Quarter-finals
All eight qualified teams from the second round progressed to the quarter-finals. The first legs were played on 11 June 2020 and the second legs took place on 24 June 2020.

|}

Tirana advanced to the semi finals.

Teuta advanced to the semi finals.

Kukësi advanced to the semi finals.

Bylis advanced to the semi finals.

Semi-finals
The first legs were played on 2 July and the second legs were played on 15 July 2020.

|}

Teuta advanced to the final.

Tirana advanced to the final.

Final

References

Cup
Albanian Cup seasons
Albanian Cup